Lyubov Panyutina (born 26 July 1970) was a Soviet-Russian luger who competed from the mid-1980s to the early 2000s. A natural track luger, she won the three medals in the women's singles event at the FIL World Luge Natural Track Championships with a two golds (1992 - Commonwealth of Independent States, 1998 - Russia) and a bronze (1990 - Soviet Union) competing for three countries.

Panyutina also won two medals at the FIL European Luge Natural Track Championships with a gold in 1997 and a silver in 1995.

References
FIL-Luge profile (as Ljubov Panjutina)
Natural track European Championships results 1970-2006.
Natural track World Championships results: 1979-2007

External links
 

1970 births
Living people
Russian female lugers
Soviet female lugers